Volition or will is the cognitive process by which an individual decides on and commits to a particular course of action. It is defined as purposive striving and is one of the primary human psychological functions. Others include affect (feeling or emotion), motivation (goals and expectations), and cognition (thinking). Volitional processes can be applied consciously or they can be automatized as habits over time.

Most modern conceptions of volition address it as a process of conscious action control which becomes automatized (e.g. see Heckhausen and Kuhl; Gollwitzer; Boekaerts and Corno).

Overview
Willpower and volition are colloquial and scientific terms (respectively) for the same process. When a person makes up their mind to do a thing, that state is termed 'immanent volition'. When we put forth any particular act of choice, that act is called an emanant, executive, or imperative volition. When an immanent or settled state of choice controls or governs a series of actions, that state is termed predominant volition. Subordinate volitions are particular acts of choice which carry into effect the object sought for by the governing or predominant volition.

According to Gary Kielhofner's "Model of Human Occupation", volition is one of the three sub-systems that act on human behavior.  Within this model, volition refers to a person's values, interests and self-efficacy (personal causation) about personal performance.

In the book A Bias for Action, the authors' purpose is to differentiate willpower from motivation - the authors use the term volition as a synonym for willpower and describe briefly the theories of Kurt Lewin. While Lewin argues that motivation and volition are one and the same, the authors claim that Narziß Ach argues differently. According to the authors, Ach claims that there is a certain threshold of desire that distinguishes motivation from volition: when desire lies below this threshold, it is motivation, and when it crosses over, it becomes volition. Using this model, the authors consider individuals' differing levels of commitment with regard to tasks by measuring it on a scale of intent from motivation to volition.  Modern writing on the role of volition, including discussions of impulse control (e.g., Kuhl and Heckhausen) and education (e.g., Corno), also make this distinction.  Corno's model ties volition to the processes of self-regulated learning.

See also
 Appetition
 Avolition
 Executive functions
 Free will
 Motivational salience
 Neuroscience of free will
 Self-agency

References

Bibliography

External links
 
 Weakness of Will (Stanford Encyclopedia of Philosophy)
 Modeling Willpower (Darcey Riley)
 Narziß Kaspar Ach (1871-1946) (University of Konstanz)
http://www.sci.brooklyn.cuny.edu/~schopra/Persons/Frankfurt.pdf (Harry Frankfurt's Analysis of the Volition among other things)

Cognition
Motivation